Bahia is a unisex given name and a surname. People with the name include:

Female
 Lalla Bahia, full name Lalla Bahia bint Antar (died 2008), Moroccan royal
 Bahia Bakari (born 1996), French woman who is a survivor of an ocean crash
 Bahia Boussad (born 1979), Algerian athlete 
 Bahia Hariri (born 1952), Lebanese politician
 Bahia Mardini, Syrian Kurdish writer
 Bahia Mouhtassine (born 1979), Moroccan tennis player
 Bahia Shehab (born 1977), Egyptian–Lebanese artist and historian

Male
 Bahia (footballer, born 1910), Antônio Almeida (1910–death date unknown), Brazilian football player
 Bahía (footballer, born 1958), Mario de Souza Mota, Brazilian football player
 Bahia (footballer, born 1997), Gilberto Jesus dos Santos, Brazilian football player

Surname
 Alan Bahia (born 1983), Brazilian football player
 André Bahia (born 1983), Brazilian football player
 Fábio Bahia (born 1983), Brazilian football player
 Gil Bahia (born 1992), Brazilian football player
 Jeferson Bahia (born 1992), Brazilian football player 
 Léo Bahia (born 1986), Brazilian football player
 Matheus Bahia (born 1999), Brazilian football player
 Mike Bahía, stage name of Michael Egred Mejía (born 1987), Brazilian musician
 Paramjit Bahia (born 1950), Canadian field hockey player 
 Patricia Bahia, American musical artist
 Salomé de Bahia (born 1945), Brazilian vocalist
 Viviane Bahia (born 1994), Brazilian water polo player

See also
 Bahia (disambiguation)

Unisex given names
Arabic feminine given names